The 39th Vanier Cup was played on November 22, 2003, at the SkyDome in Toronto, Ontario, and decided the CIS Football champion for the 2003 season. The Laval Rouge et Or won their second ever national championship by defeating the Saint Mary's Huskies by a score of 14–7, denying the Huskies a third consecutive Vanier Cup victory.

References

External links
 Official website

Vanier Cup
Vanier Cup
2003 in Toronto
November 2003 sports events in Canada
Canadian football competitions in Toronto